Kumār is a city located in Poonch, Jammu and Kashmir, India.

Altitude (feet) 4019
Altitude (meters) 1224
Time zone (est) UTC+5:30

Nearby Cities and Towns  
West North East South  
Nabina (0.6 nm)
Salotri (0.4 nm) Salan (0.9 nm) Kas Balari (1.0 nm) Kaini (0.8 nm)

References

Cities and towns in Poonch district, India